Kevin Darnell Mitchell (born January 13, 1962) is an American former Major League Baseball left fielder. Mitchell was a  two-time All-Star and the 1989 NL MVP.

Early life
Mitchell was born in San Diego to Alma Mitchell, who worked as an electrician with the US Navy. Alma and Mitchell's father, Earl, separated when Mitchell was two years old. He was raised primarily with his paternal grandmother, Josie Whitfield, who encouraged his participation in sports. Because Mitchell struggled academically, he attended several high schools in San Diego including Lincoln High School, Clairemont High School and Crawford High School, where he claimed to have played water polo. Although he has been credited with graduating from Clairemont and has claimed to have been a high school football star there, Mitchell only attended the school for two months in 1978. He was reportedly involved in street gangs as a youth but has claimed he was never himself a member; he also claimed to have been shot three times in his youth. His stepbrother, Donald, was killed in a gang fight.

Mitchell reportedly did not play high school baseball. He was signed by the New York Mets as an undrafted free agent following an open tryout at Grossmont College. He was given a $1,500 signing bonus plus $600 monthly in salary.

Playing career

New York Mets
In Amazin', Peter Golenbock's oral history of the New York Mets, Hall of Fame catcher Gary Carter said he gave Mitchell the nickname "World" for his ability to play in the infield and outfield. Carter spoke fondly of Mitchell's talents.

In the tenth inning of Game 6 of the 1986 World Series, after Wally Backman and Keith Hernandez had been retired for the first two outs, he was called to pinch hit for reliever Rick Aguilera after Gary Carter, the next hitter after Hernandez, singled. Mitchell, who had already gotten out of his uniform and had on his regular clothes, hurriedly put his uniform back on without his protective cup and went to the plate and singled. He would eventually score the tying run on Bob Stanley's wild pitch to Mookie Wilson.

In a July 2007 radio interview with local sports talk radio station KNBR, Mitchell disputed that he was out of uniform at the time, and stated that he never wore a cup, even when playing infield. When asked why he never wore a cup, Mitchell responded, "I couldn’t find one big enough for my junk." The interviewer then commented that maybe the increased mobility helped Mitchell to make the famous 1989 barehanded catch of Ozzie Smith's fly ball.

Mitchell was traded to the San Diego Padres after the 1986 season, where he played half a season before landing in San Francisco where he would reach his full potential.

San Francisco Giants
On July 4, Mitchell was traded to the Giants as part of a multi-player trade that also sent pitchers Dave Dravecky and Craig Lefferts to San Francisco in exchange for third baseman Chris Brown and pitchers Keith Comstock, Mark Davis, and Mark Grant. While Dravecky was initially considered to be the key to the trade for the Giants, it was Mitchell who emerged as a star player.

 Most Valuable Player
After two seasons playing primarily at third base, he had his best season with the Giants in  upon being moved to the outfield. He added a .353 average and 2 homers in the NLCS to help the team to its first World Series appearance since 1962.

 The barehanded catch
Mitchell set the tone for his charmed 1989 season early in the year with a unique defensive play on April 26. Sprinting toward the left field foul line in St. Louis's Busch Stadium, for a ball off the bat of Ozzie Smith, Mitchell realized he had overrun the ball, but was able to reach back and snare the ball with his bare hand.

Later years
Mitchell was a two-time All-Star with the Giants. Traded to the Mariners after the  season, he arrived at spring training the following year 30 pounds (14 kg) overweight and hit only nine homers that year while batting .286. After starting the 1992 season in a horrible slump in April and May, Mitchell rebounded and batted .337 the rest of the way and hit seven of his nine home runs and knocked in 47 of his 67 RBI in just the last 54 games of the 1992 season. He had a resurgence in two seasons with the Reds, batting .341 with 19 home runs and 64 RBI in just 323 at-bats in 1993 and .323 with 30 home runs and 77 RBI in the strike-shortened 1994 season.  However, his weight problems kept him from being more productive. Because of the baseball strike, he opted to play for the Fukuoka Daiei Hawks in Japan the following year, where he became the highest-paid player in Japanese history. In Japan, he incurred the displeasure of team management when he chose to travel to the U.S. in mid-season for treatment of knee problems against the team's wishes. He spent only two months with the team. It was discovered later that he did indeed need surgery on his knee.

In the next two years, he played for four major league teams (Cincinnati, Boston, Cleveland, Oakland), showing flashes of his former ability.

In May 1997 while with the Cleveland Indians, after teammate Chad Curtis objected to lyrics of a rap song Mitchell was playing in the clubhouse, and shut off the clubhouse stereo, Curtis exchanged punches with Mitchell, who threw Curtis over a ping pong table. Curtis sustained a bruised right thumb in the fight, and was placed on the 15-day disabled list.

Since his retirement, Mitchell lives in San Diego, and plays in the San Diego Adult Baseball League for the championship team, the San Diego Black Sox.

Arrests and suspension
Mitchell was the subject of a rape investigation in Chula Vista, California, in December 1991. No charges were filed.

After being released from Major League Baseball for the last time, he was arrested in 1999 for assaulting his father during an argument.

In 2010, Mitchell was arrested for alleged misdemeanor battery at the Bonita Golf Club in Bonita, California. He was ordered to perform community service and attend anger management classes.

Career in review
In his 13-season career with eight teams, Mitchell batted .284, with 234 home runs, 760 runs batted in, 630 runs scored, 1,173 hits, 224 doubles, 25 triples and 491 bases on balls in 1,223 games.

Mitchell's cousin, Keith Mitchell, also played in the major leagues for four teams across four seasons (between 1991 and ), ending his career with a .260 batting average and eight home runs.

See also
 List of Major League Baseball career home run leaders
 List of Major League Baseball annual runs batted in leaders
 List of Major League Baseball annual home run leaders

References

External links

Kevin Mitchell at Baseballbiography.com

1962 births
Living people
African-American baseball coaches
African-American baseball players
Águilas Cibaeñas players
American expatriate baseball players in the Dominican Republic
American expatriate baseball players in Canada
American expatriate baseball players in Japan
American expatriate baseball players in Mexico
Baseball coaches from California
Baseball players from San Diego
Boston Red Sox players
Cincinnati Reds players
Cleveland Indians players
Edmonton Trappers players
Fukuoka Daiei Hawks players
Ganaderos de Tabasco players
Jackson Mets players
Kingsport Mets players
Lincoln Saltdogs players
Lynchburg Mets players
Major League Baseball left fielders
National League All-Stars
National League home run champions
National League Most Valuable Player Award winners
National League RBI champions
New York Mets players
Oakland Athletics players
Pawtucket Red Sox players
San Diego Padres players
San Francisco Giants players
Seattle Mariners players
Silver Slugger Award winners
Sonoma County Crushers players
Tidewater Tides players
21st-century African-American people
20th-century African-American sportspeople
American shooting survivors